Ian Gillespie may refer to:

Ian Gillespie (cricketer) (born 1976), English cricketer
Ian Gillespie (footballer) (1913–1988), English footballer
Ian Gillespie (developer) (born 1961), Canadian developer